Hansonville is a locality in the Greta district of Victoria, Australia. It is part of the Rural City of Wangaratta.  It had a school in 1880.  The postcode is 3675.

Roads in the place include Moyhu-Hansonville Rd, Banksdale Rd and Glenrowan-Moyhu Road.  In the south part is School Road and Banksdale Road. Factory Creek flows to the north through the area.

People growing up in Hansonville include Tim Newth, co-director of the Tracks Dance Company; Captain Austin Mahony who won a military cross at Pozières; and John Legg (born 1892) a veterinary scientist prominent in the CSIRO.

A polling place for the Division of Indi is located at Greta Complex, Greta Recreation Reserve, Greta West-Greta South Rd.  In 2004 this booth returned an 82% vote for liberal and 12% for labor for the House of Representatives.

References 

Towns in Victoria (Australia)
Rural City of Wangaratta